The Mauritian turtle dove (Nesoenas cicur) is an extinct species of the pigeon genus Nesoenas which was endemic to Mauritius. The holotype is a right tarsometatarsus collected in 2008 in southeastern Mauritius.

References

Extinct animals of Mauritius
Extinct birds of Indian Ocean islands
Nesoenas
Birds described in 2011